The 34th Indian Infantry Division was an infantry division of the Indian Army during World War II. It was formed in March 1942 as the garrison of Ceylon. It never saw any combat and was disbanded in 1945.

Francis Tuker, then a temporary brigadier, he was appointed General Officer Commanding (GOC) 34th Indian Division on 1 October 1941 with the acting rank of major-general.

Order of battle
98th Indian Infantry Brigade
99th Indian Infantry Brigade
100th Indian Infantry Brigade
British 16th Infantry Brigade
21st (East Africa) Infantry Brigade

3rd Anti-Tank Regiment, Royal Indian Artillery, now 8 Field Regiment (India) was also part of the division.

References

Indian World War II divisions
British Indian Army divisions
Military units and formations established in 1942
Military units and formations of the British Empire in World War II
Military units and formations of Ceylon in World War II
Military units and formations disestablished in 1945